In neuroscience, a frequency-current curve (fI or F-I curve) is the function that relates the net synaptic current (I) flowing into a neuron to its firing rate (F)
Because the f-I curve only specifies the firing rate rather than exact spike times, it is a concept suited to the rate coding rather than temporal coding model of neuronal computation. Common mathematical models for f-I include the sigmoid, exponential, and rectified linear functions.

The experimental study of how neuronal firing rates can relate to applied currents goes back at least as far as Hodgkin.

References 

Neuroscience